The Council of  Europe Framework Convention on the Value of  Cultural Heritage for Society, better known as the Faro Convention, is a multilateral Council of Europe treaty whereby states agree to protect cultural heritage and the rights of citizens to access and participate in that heritage.

Content

The Faro Convention establishes rights and responsibilities to and for cultural heritage, explicitly in the context of Article 27 of the United Nations Declaration of Human Rights which guarantees the right "freely to participate in the cultural life of the community".

Article 1 of the convention states that "rights relating to cultural heritage are inherent in the right to participate in cultural life." Article 4 states that "everyone...has the right to benefit from the cultural heritage and to contribute towards its enrichment."

The convention also focuses on promoting sustainability, access and the use of digital technology in the context of cultural heritage.

Conclusion and entry into force
The Convention was concluded and signed on 27 October 2005 in Faro, Portugal. The most recent signatory was Poland in May 2022. It came into force on 1 June 2011 after being ratified by ten states.

State parties
As of June 2022, the treaty has been ratified by the following 23 states:

See also

Convention for the Protection of the Architectural Heritage of Europe

External links
Full text of the convention

References

Council of Europe treaties
Treaties concluded in 2005
Treaties entered into force in 2011
Treaties of Armenia
Treaties of Austria 
Treaties of Bosnia and Herzegovina
Treaties of Croatia
Treaties of Finland
Treaties of Hungary
Treaties of Latvia
Treaties of Luxembourg
Treaties of Moldova
Treaties of North Macedonia 
Treaties of Montenegro
Treaties of Norway 
Treaties of Portugal   
Treaties of Serbia 
Treaties of Slovakia 
Treaties of Slovenia
Treaties of Switzerland
Treaties of Ukraine
Treaties of Belgium
Treaties of Estonia
Treaties of Spain